On 12 October 2015, following the declaration of the Nepalese Constitution, and after Sushil Koirala stepped down as the Prime Minister of Nepal, Khadga Prasad Oli was elected as the new Prime Minister of Nepal. Oli's candidacy was supported by the Unified Communist Party of Nepal (Maoist), Rastriya Prajatantra Party Nepal, and several smaller parties represented in the Nepalese Parliament. After being sworn in, Khadga Prasad Oli formed a new government in a coalition with the parties that supported his election.

Ministers

See also
 Second Oli cabinet

References

Government of Nepal
Cabinet of Nepal
2015 in Nepal
2015 establishments in Nepal
2016 disestablishments in Nepal